James Bell Knight (3 January 1918 – 11 October 1943) was an Australian rules footballer who played with Geelong and Carlton in the VFL.

Family 
The son of Archie Cecil Clarence Knight (1896–1965), and Margaret May Knight (1892–1960), née Paterson, James Bell Knight was born on 3 January 1918.

Football

Geelong
Knight was Geelong's best and fairest player in 1941.

Carlton 
He joined Carlton in 1942 after Geelong withdrew from the competition due to the war and spent two seasons with the club.

Military service
While playing at Carlton he received military training; and, in 1943, he joined the RAAF, and served in Papua New Guinea, fighting against the Japanese.

He was killed on 11 October 1943 when the bombs aboard his Douglas Boston bomber (A28-26) exploded after the aircraft crashed during take-off from Goodenough Island in Papua New Guinea. The other two crew members survived the accident.

Remembered 
The runner up in the Geelong Best and Fairest now wins the Jim Knight Memorial Trophy.

See also
 List of Victorian Football League players who died in active service

Footnotes

References
 World War Two Nominal Roll: Flying Officer James Bell Knight (19067).
 Roll of Honour: Flying Officer James Bell Knight (19067), Australian War Memorial.

External links

 Blueseum profile
 RAAF Inter-services premiership team 1942, Boyles Football photos.
 1941 VFL Round Two: Geelong v St Kilda - First Game at Kardinia Park, Boyles Football photos.

1918 births
1943 deaths
Carlton Football Club players
Geelong Football Club players
Carji Greeves Medal winners
Australian rules footballers from Geelong
Australian military personnel killed in World War II
Royal Australian Air Force personnel of World War II
Royal Australian Air Force officers
Military personnel from Victoria (Australia)